is a Japanese anime director working for Toei Animation.

Works

Films

References

External links

Anime directors
Living people
Japanese film directors
Year of birth missing (living people)